William Cavendish, 2nd Earl of Devonshire (c. 1590 – 20 June 1628) was an English nobleman, courtier, and politician who sat in the House of Commons from 1614 until 1626 when he succeeded to the peerage and sat in the House of Lords.

Life

Cavendish was the second son of William Cavendish, 1st Earl of Devonshire, by his first wife Anne Keighley. He was educated by Thomas Hobbes, the philosopher, who lived at Chatsworth as his private tutor for many years. In 1608, he went up to St John's College, Cambridge accompanied by Hobbes. He was knighted at Whitehall in 1609. He then went with Hobbes on a Grand Tour from about 1610, where he visited France and Italy before his coming of age. He was a leader of court society, and an intimate friend of James I, and Hobbes praised his learning in the dedication of his translation of Thucydides.

In 1614, Cavendish was elected member of parliament for Derbyshire. He became Lord Lieutenant of Derbyshire in 1619. In 1621 he was re-elected MP for Derbyshire. In April 1622 he introduced to audiences with the king Schwarzenburg, ambassador from the Emperor Ferdinand, Valerssio from Venice, and d'Arsennes and Joachimi from the United Provinces. He was re-elected MP for Derbyshire in 1624 and 1625. In 1625 he was present at Charles I's marriage with Henrietta Maria. He was high bailiff of Tutbury in 1626 and was re-elected MP for Derbyshire in 1626, until the death of his father early in 1626 gave him a seat in the House of Lords. In the Lords, he resisted George Villiers, 1st Duke of Buckingham's attempt to find a treasonable meaning on a speech of Sir Dudley Digges (13 May 1626).

Cavendish's spending strained his resources, and he procured a private Act of Parliament to enable him to sell some of the entailed estates in discharge of his debts in 1628. His London house was in Bishopsgate, on the site afterwards occupied by Devonshire Square.

Cavendish died at his London house, from over-indulgence it was said, at the age of about 35 and was buried in All Hallows Church (All Saints Church), Derby. The monument was sculpted by Edward Marshall.

Family

Cavendish married Christian(a) Bruce, daughter of Edward Bruce, 1st Lord Kinloss, on 10 April 1608. They had three children:

Anne Cavendish (c. 1611–1638), married Robert Rich, 3rd Earl of Warwick and had issue.
William Cavendish, 3rd Earl of Devonshire (1617–1684)
Charles Cavendish (1620–1643)
 Henry Cavendish (died April 1620)

Notes

References
 Pearson, John, The Serpent and the Stag, Holt, Rinehart and Winston, 1983.
Attribution:
 

|-

1590s births
1628 deaths
Earls of Devonshire (1618 creation)
Lord-Lieutenants of Derbyshire
People from Derbyshire Dales (district)
Alumni of St John's College, Cambridge
William Cavendish, 02nd Earl of Devonshire
English MPs 1614
English MPs 1621–1622
English MPs 1624–1625
English MPs 1625
English MPs 1626